Chef (meaning Manager in English) is a Swedish language monthly management and business magazine published in Stockholm, Sweden.

History and profile
Chef was established in 1995. The magazine is part of Ledarna and is published by Chef Stockholm AB on a monthly basis. Since 2011 Cissi Elwin Frenkel has been the editor-in-chief of the magazine of which target audience is company managers. The magazine has its headquarters in Stockholm.

Chef was the best-selling business magazine in Sweden with a circulation of 111,000 copies in 2009. The magazine had a circulation of 111,600 copies in 2010 and 110,300 copies in 2011. Its circulation was 107,200 copies in 2012. It rose to 112,600 copies in 2014.

See also
 List of magazines in Sweden

References

External links
 Official website

1995 establishments in Sweden
Business magazines published in Sweden
Magazines established in 1995
Magazines published in Stockholm
Monthly magazines published in Sweden
Swedish-language magazines